Diaconeşti may refer to several villages in Romania:

 Diaconeşti, a village in Agăș Commune, Bacău County
 Diaconeşti, a village in the town of Pucioasa, Dâmboviţa County
 Diaconeşti, a village in Grădiștea, Vâlcea